The 2019 Indonesia Masters (officially known as the Daihatsu Indonesia Masters 2019 for sponsorship reasons) was a badminton tournament that took place at the Istora Gelora Bung Karno in Indonesia from 22 to 27 January 2019 and had a total purse of $350,000.

Tournament
The 2019 Indonesia Masters was the third tournament of the 2019 BWF World Tour and also part of the Indonesia Masters championships, which had been held since 2010. This tournament was organized by the Badminton Association of Indonesia with sanction from the BWF.

Venue
This international tournament was held at the Istora Gelora Bung Karno in Jakarta, Indonesia.

Point distribution
Below is the point distribution table for each phase of the tournament based on the BWF points system for the BWF World Tour Super 500 event.

Prize money
The total prize money for this tournament was US$350,000. Distribution of prize money was in accordance with BWF regulations.

Men's singles

Seeds

 Kento Momota (final) 
 Shi Yuqi (second round)
 Chou Tien-chen (first round)
 Chen Long (quarter-finals)
 Son Wan-ho (first round)
 Viktor Axelsen (semi-finals)
 Anthony Sinisuka Ginting (quarter-finals)
 Srikanth Kidambi (quarter-finals)

Finals

Top half

Section 1

Section 2

Bottom half

Section 3

Section 4

Women's singles

Seeds

 Nozomi Okuhara (first round)
 P. V. Sindhu (quarter-finals)
 Chen Yufei (semi-finals)
 Akane Yamaguchi (second round)
 Carolina Marín (final)
 He Bingjiao (semi-finals)
 Ratchanok Intanon (quarter-finals)
 Saina Nehwal (champion)

Finals

Top half

Section 1

Section 2

Bottom half

Section 3

Section 4

Men's doubles

Seeds

 Marcus Fernaldi Gideon / Kevin Sanjaya Sukamuljo (champions)
 Li Junhui / Liu Yuchen (quarter-finals)
 Takeshi Kamura / Keigo Sonoda (quarter-finals)
 Hiroyuki Endo / Yuta Watanabe (quarter-finals)
 Kim Astrup / Anders Skaarup Rasmussen (semi-finals)
 Fajar Alfian / Muhammad Rian Ardianto (quarter-finals)
 Han Chengkai / Zhou Haodong (semi-finals)
 Mohammad Ahsan / Hendra Setiawan (final)

Finals

Top half

Section 1

Section 2

Bottom half

Section 3

Section 4

Women's doubles

Seeds

 Yuki Fukushima / Sayaka Hirota (first round)
 Misaki Matsutomo / Ayaka Takahashi (champions)
 Mayu Matsumoto / Wakana Nagahara (semi-finals)
 Greysia Polii / Apriyani Rahayu (semi-finals)
 Chen Qingchen / Jia Yifan (quarter-finals)
 Lee So-hee / Shin Seung-chan (withdrew)
 Shiho Tanaka / Koharu Yonemoto (second round)
 Jongkolphan Kititharakul / Rawinda Prajongjai (quarter-finals)

Finals

Top half

Section 1

Section 2

Bottom half

Section 3

Section 4

Mixed doubles

Seeds

 Zheng Siwei / Huang Yaqiong (champions)
 Wang Yilyu / Huang Dongping (withdrew)
 Yuta Watanabe / Arisa Higashino (semi-finals)
 Tontowi Ahmad / Liliyana Natsir (final)
 Dechapol Puavaranukroh / Sapsiree Taerattanachai (second round)
 Chan Peng Soon / Goh Liu Ying (semi-finals)
 Chris Adcock / Gabby Adcock (second round)
 Zhang Nan / Li Yinhui (withdrew)

Finals

Top half

Section 1

Section 2

Bottom half

Section 3

Section 4

References

External links
 Tournament Link

Indonesian Masters (badminton)
Indonesia Masters
Indonesia Masters
Indonesia Masters